Grizzly Falls is a 1999 adventure film about a boy and a bear, set in British Columbia in the early 20th century. It was written by Stuart Margolin and Richard Beattie, and directed by Stewart Raffill.

Plot
The film starts with an old man, Harry Banks (Richard Harris) telling his grandson and granddaughter about his life as a young boy in the early 20th century.

The tale begins: Harry as a boy (Daniel Clark) is in his pre-teens. His mother (Marnie McPhail) dies, and he is sent to a boarding school because his father is abroad, so cannot look after him. Eventually his father, Tyrone Banks (Bryan Brown) comes, and takes him on a bear-hunting trip to Canada, to catch a grizzly bear.

When in Canada, British Columbia to be exact, Tyrone and Harry meet up with an experienced Native Canadian tracker with Scottish roots named Joshua McTavish  (Tom Jackson). The three then go to a saloon to find some good hunters to help them on the hunt. The men in the saloon laugh at the plan for it, but some come along, bringing dogs and guns, including Grits (Colin D. Simpson), Genet (Oliver Tobias) and Lanky (Brock Simpson).

On the hunt, the boy sees two grizzly cubs which no one else sees, then rejoins his father.

The next day, the hunters capture the two cubs, and hold them in the camp, near a waterfall called Grizzly Falls, hence the movie's title. The bear mother is angry, and comes to the camp. Although she cannot free her offspring, she instead abducts Harry to exact revenge on Tyrone.

She then runs away with him, and looks after him, feeding him, and once saving his life from timber wolves. He is at first intent on escaping from the bear, whom he names Mizzy, but eventually grows to love her.

Meanwhile Tyrone is intent on rescuing him, and Joshua comes along, but the men from the saloon and their dogs are hardly as keen. One breaks his leg at Grizzly Falls, and he and his friends leave, taking the bear cubs with them and setting up their own camp somewhere else. Tyrone and Joshua continue searching for Harry.

In another area Harry stumbles upon the saloon men's new camp whilst Mizzy is finding food. He looks inside the hut where the men are sleeping, and wakes them up. One man tries to protect the boy but another points his gun at him. Just as this man is going to shoot, Mizzy bursts through the window, knocking down one wall of the hut. This crushes one man.

Then Tyrone and Joshua find the camp, and attack the men who are in it, while the bear runs to its chained-up cubs outside, trying to free them.

The evil man gets up, but has no time to do anything because Tyrone shoots his hand, then leaps on him, and throttles him. They then begin a ferocious wrestle, which Tyrone wins, plunging his opponent into the river. Stream takes his corpse. Harry says goodbye to his bear-mother Mizzy, and she goes away into the mountains, reunited with her two cubs.

Tyrone becomes a better father, having learned a lesson on the adventure.

Reception
On Rotten Tomatoes the film has an approval rating of 50% based on reviews from 8 critics. On Metacritic, it has a score of 34% based on reviews from 10 critics, indicating a "generally unfavorable reviews".

Lawrence Van Gelder from New York Times gave the film a negative review, stating: "Pretty as a picture and pious as a sermon, Grizzly Falls combines old-fashioned boys' adventure with a heavy-handed modern lecture on parenthood. The film possesses a decent heart but suffers from a simple mind."

Grizzly Falls was nominated for a Golden Reel Award in the category of "Best Sound Editing - Foreign Feature".

See also
The Bear
The Life and Times of Grizzly Adams
King of the Grizzlies
The Bears and I

References

External links
 
 

1999 films
English-language Canadian films
Films about bears
Canadian drama films
Films directed by Stewart Raffill
Films scored by Paul Zaza
Films set in the 1900s
Grizzly bears in popular culture
Artisan Entertainment films
1990s English-language films
1990s Canadian films